Chiang Ssu-chien (1814–1894) is the grandfather of former Republic of China President Chiang Kai-shek.
 
Chiang Ssu-chien was born during the Qing Dynasty in 1814 to Chiang Chi-tseng (蔣祈增). His early years were spent as a farmer and later years were spent in Xikou, Fenghua in Zhejiang Province in a village named Jinxi (錦溪村) managing the Yutai salt store as well as making and selling wine. His business became more successful later on and improved the Chiang families social status. Chiang Ssu-chien raised two children.  His eldest son was named Chiang Chao-hai (蔣肇海) and the second son called Chiang Chao-tsung (蔣肇聰) who was Chiang Kai-shek's father. Chiang Ssu-chien died in 1894.

References

Businesspeople from Ningbo
Chiang Kai-shek family
1894 deaths
1814 births
Qing dynasty people
19th-century Chinese businesspeople